Nicolas Ernest Marie Maurice Jeandin was Governor General of Pondicherry during the period immediately following the liberation of France (1944).

Titles

References

French colonial governors and administrators
Governors of French India
1886 births
Year of death missing
20th-century French people